Manana Island can refer to:
Mānana, an island of Hawaii
Manana Island (Maine), location of the Manana Island Sound Signal Station, a National Register of Historic Places site